The Fantasy Filmfest, short FFF, is an international genre film festival held annually around September in major German cities.

Award 
In 2006, the Fantasy Filmfest established an audience award, named Fresh Blood Award, for the best first or second feature film of a director.

Winners
 2006: Brick
 2007: Ex Drummer
 2008: JCVD
 2009: District 9
 2010: Four Lions
 2011: Hell
 2012: Beasts of the Southern Wild
 2013: Blancanieves
 2014: Housebound
 2015: Shrew's Nest
 2016: Under the Shadow
 2017: I Remember You
 2018: Heavy Trip
 2019: Hotel Mumbai

References

External links 
 Official website (English/German)
 f3a.net – Fan archive and board (German)

Film festivals in Germany
Fantasy and horror film festivals
Film festivals established in 1987
Annual events in Germany
Science fiction film festivals